The siege of Mangalore was conducted during the Second Anglo-Mysore War by Tipu Sultan and forces of the Kingdom of Mysore against a British East India Company garrison led by Colonel Campbell.  The port city of Mangalore on the west coast of India was besieged from 20 May 1783 until the garrison capitulated on 30 January 1784 after being reduced to starvation; of the original garrison of 700 British soldiers and 2000 Indian troops there were only 850 survivors.  The siege was one of the last major actions of the war; Mangalore was where the treaty ending the war was signed in March 1784.

References
 
 

Conflicts in 1783
Conflicts in 1784
Sieges involving the British East India Company
Sieges involving the Kingdom of Mysore
Siege of Mangalore
Siege of Mangalore
Siege 1783
Battles of the Second Anglo-Mysore War